Trademark infringement is a violation of the exclusive rights attached to a trademark without the authorization of the trademark owner or any licensees (provided that such authorization was within the scope of the licence). Infringement may occur when one party, the "infringer", uses a trademark which is identical or confusingly similar to a trademark owned by another party, in relation to products or services which are identical or similar to the products or services which the registration covers. An owner of a trademark may commence civil legal proceedings against a party which infringes its registered trademark. In the United States, the Trademark Counterfeiting Act of 1984 criminalized the intentional trade in counterfeit goods and services.

If the respective marks and products or services are entirely dissimilar, trademark infringement may still be established if the registered mark is well known pursuant to the Paris Convention. In the United States, a cause of action for use of a mark for such dissimilar services is called trademark dilution.

In some jurisdictions a party other than the owner (e.g., a licensee) may be able to pursue trademark infringement proceedings against an infringer if the owner fails to do so.

Factors 
Courts consider various factors in order to determine whether a trademark was infringed.
 Whether the plaintiff has a valid trademark. A trademark can be valid because it is officially registered, or because it has a claim under common law.
 Whether the trademark is being used by the defendant. 
 Whether the defendant's use of the mark is "in commerce."
 Whether that use is connected to the sale, offer, distribution, or advertising of a product. 
 Whether the defendant's use of the trademark is likely to confuse consumers. 
This last factor, consumer confusion, is the main topic of debate in most cases.

Consumer confusion 
Where the respective marks or products or services are not identical, similarity will generally be assessed by reference to whether there is a likelihood of confusion that consumers will believe the products or services originated from the trademark owner.

Likelihood of confusion is not necessarily measured by actual consumer confusion if two products do not directly compete against each other but are in proximate markets. Then, to determine consumer confusion, a court may apply one of various factor tests. The primary test comes from Ninth Circuit Court of Appeals and is found in AMF, Inc v. Sleekcraft Boats, 599 F.2d 341 (C.A.9) 1979. The Court there announced eight specific elements to measure likelihood of confusion:
 Strength of the mark
 Proximity of the goods
 Similarity of the marks
 Evidence of actual confusion
 Marketing channels used
 Type of goods and the degree of care likely to be exercised by the purchaser
 Defendant's intent in selecting the mark
 Likelihood of expansion of the product lines

Other Courts have fashioned their own tests for likelihood of confusion—like those announced in In re E.I. du Pont de Nemours & Co., 476 F.2d 1357, 177 USPQ 563 (CCPA 1973), known collectively as the DuPont factors.

Defenses 
The party accused of infringement may be able to defeat infringement proceedings if it can establish a valid exception (e.g., comparative advertising) or defence (e.g., laches) to infringement, or attack and cancel the underlying registration (e.g., for non-use) upon which the proceedings are based. Other defenses include genericness, functionality, abandonment, or fair use.

Globally 
The ACTA trade agreement, signed in May 2011 by the United States, Japan, Switzerland, and the EU, requires that its parties add criminal penalties, including incarceration and fines, for copyright and trademark infringement, and obligated the parties to actively police for infringement.

In many countries (but not in countries like the United States, which recognizes common law trademark rights), a trademark which is not registered cannot be "infringed" as such, and the trademark owner cannot bring infringement proceedings. Instead, the owner may be able to commence proceedings under the common law for passing off or misrepresentation, or under legislation which prohibits unfair business practices. In some jurisdictions, infringement of trade dress may also be actionable.

Notable cases 
 Facebook, Inc. v. Power Ventures, Inc.
 Google, Inc. v. American Blind & Wallpaper Factory, Inc., in which Google's AdWords program was alleged to be in violation of trademark
 Rescuecom Corp. v. Google Inc., in which the use of trademarks in Google's AdWords program was found to be a "use in commerce" under the Lanham Act
 Network Automation, Inc. v. Advanced Systems Concepts, Inc., in which the use of a competitor's trademark as an Internet advertisement search keyword was found to not constitute trademark infringement
 College Network, Inc. v. Moore Educational Publishers, Inc., in which the use of a competitor's trademark does not qualify as a "use in commerce" is upheld
 Polaroid Corp. v. Polarad Elects.

See also 
 Madrid Protocol
 Canadian trademark law
 Exhaustion of rights
 Passing off
 Trade dress
 Patent infringement
 Copyright infringement
Brand protection

References

External links 
 World Intellectual Property Organization
 Madrid Protocol Text of Treaty
 Pfizer Inc. Must Pay $143 Million to Trovan Ltd. in Largest Trademark Judgement Ever Awarded in the United States
 Section 43(a) of the Lanham Act (15 U.S.C. 1125(a)) 
 The Trade Mark Act (UK)
 Study of Alleged Trademark Infringement Against Global Brands in Internet Search Advertising
 Trade Marks Acts | Intellectual Property India
 Trademark

Infringement
Commercial crimes
Intellectual property infringement